Enterprise Capital Funds are financial schemes established by the Department for Business, Innovation and Skills (BIS) in the United Kingdom to address a market weakness in the provision of equity finance to UK small and medium enterprises (SMEs). Government funding is used alongside private sector funds to establish funds that operate within the "equity gap"; targeting investments of up to £5 million that have the potential to provide a good commercial return. The first five funds supported under the scheme were launched in 2006-7 following a pathfinder competition. A further three funds were awarded ECF status in 2007. As of November 2019, 29 ECFs have been launched.

Fund management 
As of 1 April 2008, responsibility for the management of ECFs along with BIS's other equity funds and the Small Firms Loan Guarantee (SFLG) was transferred to a new body, Capital for Enterprise Limited (CfEL). This change did not change the nature of the funds or their policy objectives.

CfEL was incorporated in March 2007 as a private limited company wholly owned by BIS, and commenced actively trading in April 2008. It was an asset management business specialising in designing and managing support programmes for SME finance. Its position in the SME finance markets provided it with a unique ability to inform and implement Government policy on those markets.

On 1 October 2013, CfEL became part of the British Business Bank, which is now responsible for the management of all of CfEL's financial schemes, including ECFs.

Approved funds 
The current funds as of March 2017 are:

 Accelerated Digital Ventures
 Active ECF
 Amadeus and Angels Seed Fund
 Catapult Growth Fund
 Dawn Enterprise Capital Fund
 Edge ECF
 Entrepreneur First Next Stage Fund
 Episode 1 Ventures
 Foresight Nottingham Fund
 IQ Capital Fund I
 Longwall Ventures ECF
 MMC Enterprise Capital Fund
 Notion Capital Fund 2
 Oxford Technology Management
 Panoramic ECF 1
 Passion Capital ECF
 Seraphim Capital Fund 
 Seraphim Space Fund
 Sustainable Technology Partnership

European Commission investigation 
In November 2013, Enterprise Capital Funds came in for scrutiny from the European Commission after several UK government-backed funds were found to be investing in SMEs beyond the guidelines permitted by EU law. One implication is that such businesses could be forced to hand back millions of pounds to HM Treasury.

References

External links
 Enterprise Capital Funds page on CfEL website

Finance in the United Kingdom
Venture capital
Department for Business, Innovation and Skills